The 2016 Euroformula Open Championship was a multi-event motor racing championship for single-seat open wheel formula racing cars that held across Europe. The championship featured drivers competing in two-litre Formula Three racing cars built by Italian constructor Dallara which conform to the technical regulations, or formula, for the championship. It was the third Euroformula Open Championship season.

Teams and drivers
 All cars were powered by Toyota engines.

Race calendar

An eight-round provisional calendar was revealed on 12 November 2015. All rounds will support the International GT Open  (excepting Jerez) and Formula V8 3.5 (excepting Estoril and Le Castellet) series. On 8 March 2016 the last two rounds were swapped. Rounds denoted with a blue background are part of the Spanish Formula Three Championship.

Championship standings

Euroformula Open Championship

Drivers' championship
Points were awarded as follows:

Rookies' championship
Points were awarded as follows:

Teams' championship
Points were awarded as follows:

Spanish Formula Three Championship

Drivers' championship
Points were awarded as follows:

Teams' championship
Points were awarded as follows:

References

External links
 

Euroformula Open Championship seasons
Euroformula Open
Euroformula Open
Euroformula Open